Layne Griffin Riggs (born June 11, 2002) is an American professional stock car racing driver. He competes part-time in the NASCAR Craftsman Truck Series, driving the No. 1 Toyota Tundra for TRICON Garage, and the No. 62 Tundra for Halmar Friesen Racing. He has also competed in the CARS Late Model Stock Tour, driving the No. 99 Ford Mustang for his family owned team, Riggs Racing. He is the 2022 NASCAR Advance Auto Parts Weekly Series national champion. He is the son of former NASCAR driver Scott Riggs.

Racing career

Early career
Growing up in a racing family, Riggs began driving at the age of 10, racing in Limited Sportsman events at Orange County Speedway. He raced there for several seasons, eventually earning the track championship.

CARS Tour
On June 11, 2016, his 14th birthday, Riggs made his debut in the CARS Late Model Stock Tour, driving for his family team, Riggs Racing. In his first start at Tri-County Motor Speedway, he would qualify an impressive 2nd. He would finish in 20th after being involved in a wreck on lap 59. He would run the final five races of the season, recording his best finish of 2nd at Southern National Motorsports Park. That same year, he would race in the Thanksgiving  All-Star Classic, recording a finish of 8th. 

He would run the full schedule in 2017, earning two wins at Dominion Raceway and Orange County Speedway. He ended the season with two wins, five top 5's, and ten top 10's, finishing 3rd in the final standings.

Riggs started the 2018 season on a low note, finishing outside the top 10 in the first two races. He rebounded with a ninth place finish at Hickory Motor Speedway, along with a streak of top three finishes in the next three races. He would earn his first win of the season at Kingsport Speedway.

In October 2019, Riggs would win the Rodney Cook Classic at Ace Speedway, after the leaders wrecked on lap 114.

2020 would be a breakout season for Riggs, finishing inside the top ten in all but two races, and capturing two wins at Langley Speedway and Carteret Motor Speedway. At the end of the season, he finished a career-high 2nd in the final point standings.

Riggs had a struggling season in 2021, finishing outside the top 15 in most of the races. He scored one win, five top fives, and five top tens, ranking him 10th in the final point standings.

For 2022, Riggs would scale to a part-time schedule, to focus on winning the national championship in the NASCAR Advance Auto Parts Weekly Series.

Advance Auto Parts Weekly Series
In 2022, Riggs would join the NASCAR Advance Auto Parts Weekly Series, and compete for the national championship, racing at Dominion Raceway, Hickory Motor Speedway, South Boston Speedway, and Wake County Speedway. After winning 16 races, 29 top fives, and 35 top tens, Riggs was declared as the 2022 national champion. He finished just four points ahead of last year's champion, Peyton Sellers. At 20-years old, he is also the youngest driver to win the championship, beating out Sellers' 2005 championship, when he won it at 21-years old.

Truck Series

2022
On July 19, 2022, Halmar Friesen Racing announced that Riggs will make his NASCAR Camping World Truck Series debut at the Lucas Oil Indianapolis Raceway Park, finishing 7th driving their No. 62 Toyota Tundra, at the next race at Richmond Raceway in August and would qualify 4th for the race but would ultimately finish 19th 2 laps down. Riggs would make his final start of the year at the season finale at Phoenix Raceway where he would qualify 2nd and lead five laps early in the race. After being involved in a wreck during the middle of the race, he would rebound and finish 13th.

2023
On December 12, 2022, Stewart Friesen stated on SiriusXM NASCAR Radio that Riggs will return to his team for another part-time schedule in 2023. Friesen also stated that if Layne can find full sponsorship, he will most likely run full-time in the 62 truck. However, sponsorship for a full-time season was not found. On March 15, 2023, TRICON Garage announced that Riggs will drive their No. 1 truck in the race at Atlanta.

Personal life
Riggs is the son of former NASCAR driver, Scott Riggs. He currently attends University of North Carolina at Charlotte, studying in mechanical engineering.

March 3rd in Durham County, North Carolina is celebrated as Layne Riggs Day.

Motorsports career results

NASCAR
(key) (Bold – Pole position awarded by qualifying time. Italics – Pole position earned by points standings or practice time. * – Most laps led. ** – All laps led.)

Craftsman Truck Series

 Season still in progress

References

External links

Living people
2002 births
NASCAR drivers
Racing drivers from North Carolina
People from Durham County, North Carolina